Richwood High School is a public high school in unincorporated Ouachita Parish, Louisiana, United States, south of the City of Richwood. It is a part of the Ouachita Parish School Board.

History
Abe E. Pierce, III, the first African American mayor of Monroe (1996-2000) taught science at Richwood and served as principal from 1956 to 1966. He said in a 2009 interview that teaching at Richwood had been the most rewarding of all the jobs he ever held.

Athletics
Richwood High athletics competes in the LHSAA.

Championships
Football championships
(4) State Championships: 1962, 1963, 1964, 1974

Notable alumni

Joe Profit, 3st round draft pick and running back in the NFL for the Atlanta Falcons
Boo Robinson, defensive tackle in the NFL for the Philadelphia Eagles
Storm Warren (born 1988), power forward for the LSU Tigers and the Israeli Basketball Premier League
Sammy White, former NFL wide receiver for the Minnesota Vikings
Rod Williams, cornerback in the CFL for the Edmonton Eskimos and Saskatchewan Roughriders
Larry Wright, 1st round draft pick number 17 guard in NBA for Washington Bullets
Larry Wright (basketball) (born 1954), head coach of the Grambling Tigers men's basketball team

References

External links
 Richwood High School website

Public high schools in Louisiana
Schools in Ouachita Parish, Louisiana